Oreské is a village and municipality in Skalica District in the Trnava Region of western Slovakia.

History 
In historical records the village was first mentioned in 1392.

Geography 
The municipality lies at an altitude of 243 metres and covers an area of km2. It has a population of about 345 people.

References

External links 

 Official page
 https://web.archive.org/web/20071027094149/http://www.statistics.sk/mosmis/eng/run.html 

Villages and municipalities in Skalica District